Ofotfjord ( or ) is a fjord in Nordland county, Norway. In the English language and in many historical documents, this fjord is often referred to as the Narvik Fjord because the town of Narvik is located on the inner shores of the fjord, but this is not an official name of the fjord.

The fjord is surrounded by mountains, some reaching , and even  in Skjomen, where the Frostisen glacier can be seen. The only large lowland area is on parts of the northern shore, around Harstad/Narvik Airport, Evenes, although there are smaller areas near the fjord and in narrow valleys (for instance, the Narvik peninsula, where the harbour and city centre of Narvik is located).

The bedrock around the fjord consist of both hard minerals like gneiss and granite as well as softer minerals rich in lime; there is a dolomite quarry in the municipality of Narvik Municipality (photo).

Name
The surrounding Ofoten district is named after the Ofotfjord (Old Norse: Ófóti). The meaning of the first element is unknown and the last element is derived from the Old Norse word fótr which means "foot". The oldest form of the name could have been Úffóti. In this case, the first element is úfr which means "Eurasian eagle-owl". The three inner branches of the Ofotfjord might have been compared with the three claws of an owl.

Geography
The Ofotfjord is the longest fjord in Nordland county and the fourth longest in Northern Norway. The municipalities of Tjeldsund and Evenes are located on the northern shore and the large Narvik Municipality is located on the eastern and southern shores of the fjord. The municipality of Lødingen (and beyond that Lofoten) and the large Vestfjord is located west-south-west of the Ofotfjord.

Several smaller fjord branches extend from the main fjord. From north-west, going clockwise, these are: Ramsundet (which is actually a narrow strait connecting with the larger Tjeldsundet), Bogen (a fairly wide bay), Herjangsfjord (the widest of these branches), Rombaken (which is crossed by the European route E6 highway using the Rombak Bridge), Beisfjorden (crossed by the European route E6 highway using the Beisfjord Bridge), Skjomen (the longest of these fjord branches, crossed by the E6 highway using the Skjomen Bridge) and finally Ballangen. At the mouth of Ofotfjord, on the southern side, is another fjord, the narrow Efjorden, which extends southeast (crossed by the E6 highway using the Efjord Bridges).

Fauna

The Ofotfjord has a rich marine life, with huge quantities of herring staying in the fjord in the winter. These fish attract a lot of whales, most notably orca. Divers have occasionally observed lobsters in the fjord, the northernmost sightings of lobsters in the world. Cod, as well as coalfish, are the most common fish species throughout the year. Mackerel is common from July to mid-September. White-tailed eagles and Eurasian otters have made a strong comeback and are now very common in and around the fjord. Gulls are common all year, and many migratory birds arrive in summer, such as oystercatchers and grey herons.

History

Naval battleground
In the Battles of Narvik in World War II, the Ofotfjord was the scene for several naval battles, and many ships are resting at the bottom, especially in the vicinity of Narvik harbour. These are very popular among divers. However, some of these shipwrecks are declared war graves and are thus protected by law. The German destroyer Georg Thiele was scuttled and is still visible from around the railway between Straumsnes and Rombak railway station.

References

External links

Newspaper article: Dead Orca stranded, skeleton to be preserved
Pictures of Tirpitz and Admiral Hipper in Bogen bay
Wrecks of Narvik - wreck diving in the Narvik area

Fjords of Nordland
Narvik
Evenes
Tjeldsund